Kemerkaya is a village in the Bolvadin District, Afyonkarahisar Province, Turkey. Its population is 1,730 (2021). Before the 2013 reorganisation, it was a town (belde).

References

Villages in Bolvadin District